Widow's Weeds is the first full-length album by Norwegian gothic metal band Tristania.

Track listing
All music written by Tristania.

Personnel

Tristania
 Vibeke Stene – soprano, choir
 Morten Veland – harsh vocals, guitars, choir
 Anders H. Hidle – guitars, choir
 Rune Østerhus – bass
 Einar Moen – synth, programming
 Kenneth Olsson – drums, choir

Session members
Østen Bergøy – clean vocals on "Angellore", choir
Pete Johansen – violin
Hilde Egeland, Marita Herikstad, Hilde T. Bommen – choir

References

External links

1998 debut albums
Tristania (band) albums
Napalm Records albums